ECAL or ECal may refer to:
Eastern California, a region defined as being east of the Sierra Nevada mountain range
ECAL Pty Ltd, a SaaS Technology Company
École cantonale d'art de Lausanne, a university of art and design located in Renens, Switzerland
Environment and Climate Adaptation Levy, Plastic Bag Levy in Fiji
European Conference on Artificial Life, Academic conference held at The University of York, United Kingdom,